In mathematics, a Hermitian connection  is a connection on a Hermitian vector bundle  over a smooth manifold  which is compatible with the Hermitian metric

The curvature of the Chern connection is a (1, 1)-form. For details, see Hermitian metrics on a holomorphic vector bundle.

In particular, if the base manifold is Kähler and the vector bundle is its tangent bundle, then the Chern connection coincides with the Levi-Civita connection of the associated Riemannian metric.

References 
 Shiing-Shen Chern, Complex Manifolds Without Potential Theory. 
 Shoshichi Kobayashi, Differential geometry of complex vector bundles. Publications of the Mathematical Society of Japan, 15. Princeton University Press, Princeton, NJ, 1987. xii+305 pp. .

Complex manifolds
Structures on manifolds
Riemannian geometry